Metazygia is a genus of orb-weaver spiders first described by F. O. Pickard-Cambridge in 1904. They physically resemble members of Nuctenea, but they do not have fine setae on the carapace.

Species
 it contains ninety species:

M. adisi Levi, 1995 – Brazil
M. aldela Levi, 1995 – Brazil
M. amalla Levi, 1995 – Brazil
M. arnoi Levi, 1995 – Brazil
M. atalaya Levi, 1995 – Peru
M. atama Levi, 1995 – Brazil
M. bahama Levi, 1995 – Bahama Is.
M. bahia Levi, 1995 – Brazil
M. barueri Levi, 1995 – Brazil
M. benella Levi, 1995 – Panama, Colombia
M. bolivia Levi, 1995 – Bolivia
M. calix (Walckenaer, 1841) – USA
M. carimagua Levi, 1995 – Colombia
M. carolinalis (Archer, 1951) – USA
M. carrizal Levi, 1995 – Guatemala
M. castaneoscutata (Simon, 1895) – Peru, Brazil
M. cazeaca Levi, 1995 – Brazil
M. chenevo Levi, 1995 – Colombia, Guyana
M. chicanna Levi, 1995 – Mexico, Belize, Honduras, Jamaica
M. cienaga Levi, 1995 – Hispaniola
M. corima Levi, 1995 – Colombia
M. corumba Levi, 1995 – Bolivia, Brazil
M. crabroniphila Strand, 1916 – Brazil
M. crewi (Banks, 1903) – Greater Antilles, Virgin Is.
M. cunha Levi, 1995 – Brazil
M. curari Levi, 1995 – Brazil
M. dubia (Keyserling, 1864) – Costa Rica, Cuba to Galapagos Is., Peru, Brazil
M. ducke Levi, 1995 – Brazil, Bolivia
M. enabla Levi, 1995 – Colombia, Venezuela
M. erratica (Keyserling, 1883) – Brazil
M. floresta Levi, 1995 – Brazil
M. genaro Levi, 1995 – Peru
M. genialis (Keyserling, 1892) – Brazil, Dominican Republic (Hispaniola)
M. goeldii Levi, 1995 – French Guiana, Brazil
M. gregalis (O. Pickard-Cambridge, 1889) – Nicaragua, Caribbean to Argentina
M. ikuruwa Levi, 1995 – Guyana
M. incerta (O. Pickard-Cambridge, 1889) – Belize to Panama
M. ipago Levi, 1995 – Brazil
M. ipanga Levi, 1995 – Bolivia, Brazil, Argentina
M. isabelae Levi, 1995 – Brazil
M. ituari Levi, 1995 – Brazil
M. jamari Levi, 1995 – Brazil, Suriname
M. keyserlingi Banks, 1929 – Costa Rica, Panama, Colombia, Trinidad
M. lagiana Levi, 1995 – Peru, Brazil, Bolivia, Argentina
M. laticeps (O. Pickard-Cambridge, 1889) – Guatemala to Bolivia, Brazil
M. lazepa Levi, 1995 – Colombia, Venezuela
M. levii Santos, 2003 – Brazil
M. limonal Levi, 1995 – Peru, Brazil, Argentina
M. lopez Levi, 1995 – Colombia, Venezuela, Peru, Brazil
M. loque Levi, 1995 – Bolivia
M. manu Levi, 1995 – Peru, French Guiana
M. mariahelenae Levi, 1995 – Brazil
M. matanzas Levi, 1995 – Cuba
M. moldira Levi, 1995 – Ecuador, Peru
M. mundulella (Strand, 1916) – Brazil
M. nigrocincta (F. O. Pickard-Cambridge, 1904) – Mexico to Panama
M. nobas Levi, 1995 – Ecuador
M. octama Levi, 1995 – Panama to Peru
M. oro Levi, 1995 – Ecuador
M. pallidula (Keyserling, 1864) – Mexico to Peru
M. paquisha Levi, 1995 – Venezuela, Peru
M. pastaza Levi, 1995 – Peru
M. patiama Levi, 1995 – Peru, Brazil
M. peckorum Levi, 1995 – Colombia, Ecuador, Peru, Brazil
M. pimentel Levi, 1995 – Venezuela, Peru
M. redfordi Levi, 1995 – Brazil
M. rogenhoferi (Keyserling, 1878) – Brazil
M. rothi Levi, 1995 – Colombia
M. samiria Levi, 1995 – Peru
M. saturnino Levi, 1995 – Brazil
M. sendero Levi, 1995 – Colombia, Ecuador, Peru
M. serian Levi, 1995 – Costa Rica
M. silvestris (Bryant, 1942) – Puerto Rico
M. souza Levi, 1995 – Brazil
M. taman Levi, 1995 – Mexico
M. tanica Levi, 1995 – Guyana, French Guiana
M. tapa Levi, 1995 – Colombia, Peru, French Guiana
M. uma Levi, 1995 – Colombia, Peru, Brazil
M. uraricoera Levi, 1995 – Brazil, Guyana, Suriname
M. uratron Levi, 1995 – Brazil
M. valentim Levi, 1995 – Brazil
M. vaupes Levi, 1995 – Colombia, Peru, Brazil
M. vaurieorum Levi, 1995 – Guatemala
M. viriosa (Keyserling, 1892) – Brazil
M. voluptifica (Keyserling, 1892) – Colombia to Argentina
M. voxanta Levi, 1995 – Brazil
M. wittfeldae (McCook, 1894) – USA to Costa Rica
M. yobena Levi, 1995 – Colombia to Guyana, Bolivia
M. yucumo Levi, 1995 – Colombia, Peru, Bolivia, French Guiana
M. zilloides (Banks, 1898) – USA, Caribbean to Honduras

References

Araneidae
Araneomorphae genera
Spiders of North America
Spiders of South America